Antonio Orozco (born 30 October 1987) is a Mexican professional boxer.

Amateur career
Antonio had a very good amateur career, he holds victories over Mexican Olympian, Jessie Vargas and U.S. Olympian, Javier Molina. Orozco boxed out of The Garden City Boxing Club where he was trained by five trainers. His original trainers included Ignacio "Buck" Avila, Antonio Orozco Sr., Manuel Rios, Juan M. Aldana Jr. and Alfred Ritz.

Professional career
On June 11, 2010, Orozco beat Mike Peralta by unanimous decision in San Diego.

In July 2011, Antonio beat the veteran Josh Beeman by knockout. This was the first time he had ever been knocked down in a fight.

On September 14, 2018, fought for a world title for the first time in his career, against Jose Carlos Ramirez, for the WBC light welterweight belt. In action-packed fight, Orozco got dropped twice by Ramirez, once in the fourth and once in the eighth round. Ramirez was also the more active fighter, especially towards the end of the fight, earning him the unanimous decision win over Orozco.

In his next bout, Orozco got a comeback win against Jose Luis Rodriguez. This was Orozco's first fight under legendary trainer Freddie Roach. Both boxers had they say throughout the fight, but Orozco got the edge with his aggressiveness and boxing skills, en route to a unanimous decision win.

On August 10, 2019, Orozco fought undefeated rising prospect Vergil Ortiz Jr. Orozco got dropped three times by Ortiz Jr, which culminated in a TKO victory for Ortiz Jr in the sixth round.

Professional boxing record

{|class="wikitable" style="text-align:center"
|-
!
!Result
!Record
!Opponent
!Type
!Round, time
!Date
!Location
!Notes
|-
|30
|Loss
|28–2
|style="text-align:left;"| Vergil Ortiz Jr.
|KO
|6 (12), 
|Aug 10, 2019
|style="text-align:left;"| 
|
|-
|29
|Win
|28–1
|style="text-align:left;"| Jose Luis Rodriguez
|UD
|10
|Mar 30, 2019
|style="text-align:left;"| 
|
|-
|28
|Loss
|27–1
|style="text-align:left;"| José Carlos Ramírez
|UD
|12
|Sep 14, 2018
|style="text-align:left;"| 
|style="text-align:left;"|
|-
|27
|Win
|27–0
|align=left| Martin Honorio
|UD
|8
|16 Mar 2018
|align=left|
|align=left|
|-align=center
|26
|Win
|26–0
|align=left| KeAndre Gibson
|TKO
|4 (10), 
|1 Apr 2017
|align=left|
|align=left|
|-align=center
|25
|Win
|25–0
|align=left| Abner Lopez
|UD
|10
|30 Jul 2016
|align=left|
|align=left|
|-align=center
|24
|Win
|24–0
|align=left| Miguel Acosta
|KO
|1 (10), 
|25 Mar 2016
|align=left|
|align=left|
|-align=center
|23
|Win
|23–0
|align=left| Humberto Soto
|UD
|10
|3 Oct 2015
|align=left|
|align=left|
|-align=center
|-align=center
|22
|Win || 22–0 ||align=left| Emanuel Taylor
|UD || 10 || 15 May 2015 || align=left|
|align=left|
|-align=center
|21
|Win || 21–0 ||align=left| Steve Forbes
|UD || 8 || 10 Oct 2014 || align=left|
|align=left|
|-align=center
|20
|Win || 20–0 ||align=left| Martin Honorio
|UD || 10 || 15 May 2014 || align=left|
|align=left|
|-align=center
|19
|Win || 19–0 ||align=left| Miguel Angel Huerta
|KO || 2 (10),  || 24 Jan 2014 || align=left|
|align=left|
|-align=center
|18
|Win || 18–0 ||align=left| Ivan Hernandez
|KO || 3 (10),  || 24 Aug 2013 || align=left|
|align=left|
|-align=center
|17
|Win || 17–0 ||align=left| Jose Reynoso
|TKO || 7 (10),  || 3 May 2013 || align=left|
|align=left|
|-align=center
|16
|Win || 16–0 ||align=left| Danny Escobar
|KO || 6 (8),  || 10 Nov 2012 || align=left|
|align=left|
|-align=center
|15
|Win || 15–0 ||align=left| Alberto Cruz
|TKO || 3 (8),  || 30 Jun 2012 || align=left|
|align=left|
|-align=center
|14
|Win || 14–0 ||align=left| Dillet Frederick
|TKO || 3 (8),  || 5 May 2012 || align=left|
|align=left|
|-align=center
|13
|Win || 13–0 ||align=left| Rodolfo Armenta
|TKO || 4 (8),  || 24 Feb 2012 || align=left|
|align=left|
|-align=center
|12
|Win || 12–0 ||align=left| Fernando Rodríguez
|UD || 6 || 17 Sep 2011 || align=left|
|align=left|
|-align=center
|11
|Win || 11–0 ||align=left| Josh Beeman
|KO || 4 (6),  || 1 Jul 2011 || align=left|
|align=left|
|-align=center
|10
|Win || 10–0 ||align=left| Hensley Strachan
|KO || 1 (6) || 2 Jun 2011 ||align=left|
|align=left|
|-align=center
|9
|Win || 9–0 ||align=left| Manuel Aguilar
|TKO || 1 ,  || 18 Mar 2011 ||align=left|
|align=left|
|-align=center
|8
|Win || 8–0 ||align=left| Humberto Tapia
|UD || 6  || 26 Aug 2010 ||align=left|
|align=left|
|-align=center
|7
|Win || 7–0 ||align=left| Mike Peralta
|UD || 6 || 11 Jun 2010 ||align=left|
|align=left|
|-align=center
|6
|Win || 6–0 ||align=left| Jaime Orrantia 
|KO || 3 (6),  || 25 Feb 2010 ||align=left|
|align=left|
|-align=center
|5
|Win || 5–0 ||align=left| Mario Angeles   
|TKO || 1 (4),  || 12 Nov 2009 ||align=left|
|align=left|
|-align=center
|4
|Win || 4–0 ||align=left| Antonio Sorria
|TKO || 3 (4),  || 4 Jun 2009 ||align=left|
|align=left|
|-align=center 
|3  
|Win || 3–0 ||align=left| Yakub Shidaev
|UD || 4 || 30 Apr 2009 ||align=left|
|align=left|
|-align=center
|2   
|Win || 2–0 ||align=left| Juan Carlos Diaz
|KO || 1 (4),  || 26 Mar 2009 ||align=left|
|align=left|
|-align=center
|1
|Win || 1–0 ||align=left| Ricardo Martinez
|TKO ||3 (4),  ||  27 Jun 2008 ||align=left|
|align=left|
|-align=center

References

External links

People from Tecate
Boxers from Baja California
Light-welterweight boxers
1987 births
Living people
Mexican male boxers